Bapora is a village in the Bhiwani district of the Indian state of Haryana. , the village had 1,657 households with a total population of 34,332 of which 17,651 were male and 16,681 female. The major population of area are from Brahman and Rajput.

History 
Thikana of Bapora was founded by a Tanwar Rajput Chieftain Thakur Jagsi Ram Singhji, also known as Baba Jagsi. Baba Jagsi was great-great-great grandson of Rao Raja Jatmal Singhji (also known as Jatuji) who came from Patan to rule the present-day areas of southern Haryana (Bhiwani-Mahendragrah and some area of Hisar). The descendants of Rao Jatuji are known as the Jatu Tanwar. They have ruled over 1440 villages in their times

Battle of Bapora 
A battle was fought at Bapora with a locally famous Nawab Mulla Farid Ladai in the 17th century. Nawab’s army was 5 or 10 times bigger than the Rajputs of Bapora, but the Rajputs of Bapora bravely fought and won that battle. A nagada is kept in the Shivala Mandir, near Government Primary School of Bapora, which was used in that battle. General V.K. Singh describes his village in his autobiography as given below -

Notable individuals

Public Figures 

 General V.K. Singh PVSM, AVSM, YSM -former Chief of the Army Staff. and Minister of State in the Union Government of India.
 Pandit Devi Prashan Kaushik - former Chairperson, Haryana State Electricity Board which was further divided into two parts namely UHBVN and DHBVN.

Armed Forces of India 
Air Marshal Prithi Singh PVSM, AVSM, VM & Bar -former AOC-in-C Western Air Command. He had piloted most number of aircraft in Indian Air Force.
 Air Marshal Vikram Singh AVSM, VSM -present AOC-in-C South-Western Air Command.

Paramilitary Forces of India 
Commandant Bhim Singh Tanwar

Judiciary 
Justice Raj Mohan Singh, Punjab and Haryana High Court.
Justice Pitambar Lal Goyal

Civil Services 
Dr. S.K. Goyal IAS
Meenakshi Goyal IAS
Mukund Tanwar HCS

British Awards 
Sardar Bahadur Captain Umda Singh, Member of Royal Victorian Order and Aide-de-camp (ADC) to King of United Kingdom Edward VII during his time.  Later, he remained Magistrate of Tehsil Bhiwani.
 Rao Bahadur Lieutenant Thakur Sukhpal Singh, recipient of Indian Distinguished Service Medal and administrator at Bhaji State.

In Media

Armed Forces of India 
Bapora girl does Haryana proud 
Bapora, Haryana's Subedar Bir Singh Tanwar. both of his sons and daughter got commission in our Air Force .
 केंद्रीय मंत्री वीके सिंह के पैतृक गांव बापोड़ा का लाडला बना लेफ्टिनेंट
भीम सिंह तंवर का राष्ट्रपति पुलिस पदक के लिए हुआ चयन
वायुसेना उप प्रमुख एयर मार्शल संदीप सिंह का बापोड़ा से क्या सम्बंध ?

Events 

 New Army Chief Bapora's crowning glory
 The General goes home

References

Sources
 

Villages in Bhiwani district